Alexandra Sicoe (24 August 1932 – 23 March 2019)) was a Romanian sprinter. She competed in the women's 100 metres at the 1952 Summer Olympics.

References

External links
 

1932 births
2019 deaths
Athletes (track and field) at the 1952 Summer Olympics
Romanian female sprinters
Olympic athletes of Romania
Olympic female sprinters
People from Olt County